Munsee (also known as Munsee Delaware, Delaware, Ontario Delaware) is an endangered language of the Eastern Algonquian subgroup of the Algonquian language family, itself a branch of the Algic language family. Munsee is one of the two Delaware languages (also known as Lenape languages, after the tribe's autonym).  It is very closely related to the Unami Delaware, but the two are sufficiently different that they are considered separate languages. Munsee was spoken aboriginally in the vicinity of the modern New York City area in the United States, including western Long Island, Manhattan Island, Staten Island, as well as adjacent areas on the mainland: southeastern New York State, the northern third of New Jersey, and northeastern Pennsylvania.

As of 2018, Munsee was spoken only on the Moraviantown Reserve in Ontario, Canada, by two elderly individuals, aged 77 and 90. making it critically endangered. The language that the individuals speak differs between speakers, each having a personal dialect. There has been interest in learning the language by younger individuals.

Classification
Munsee is an Eastern Algonquian language, which is the sole recognized genetic subgroup descending from Proto-Algonquian, the common ancestor language of the Algonquian language family.  Munsee is very closely related to Unami Delaware.  Munsee and Unami constitute the Delaware languages, comprising a subgroup within Eastern Algonquian. Taken together with Mahican, the Delaware languages constitute Delawaran, a subgroup within Eastern Algonquian.

The term Munsee developed as an English name for the aggregated group that formed along the upper Delaware River north of the Delaware Water Gap.  Other Munsee dialect speakers joined the Minisink group; the earliest recorded mention of Munsee dates from 1725. Minisink is a Munsee term meaning 'at the island', and is to be transcribed . It is the locative form of a now disused word  'island' (no source given, not a form given in records and not a normal Munsee noun ending; viz. , ; form suggests 'small island'); cognates in other Algonquian languages are e.g. Ojibwe , 'island'. Orthographic  in the form Minisink is the modern Munsee locative suffix  (discussed below in the Grammar section). The term Munsee is the English adaptation of a regularly formed word,  ('person from Minisink').

Over time the British extended the term Munsee to any speaker of the Munsee language. Attempts to derive Munsee from a word meaning 'stone' or 'mountain,' as proposed by Brinton, are incorrect. Kraft's claim that Munsee is not an indigenous term, and that it results from a "corruption" of English use of Minisink is incorrect.  The term follows a regular pattern of Munsee word formation.

Ethnonyms
Names for the speakers of Munsee are used in complex ways in both English and in Munsee. The Unami language is sometimes treated as "Delaware" or "Delaware proper", reflecting the original application of the term Delaware to Unami speakers, but Munsee speakers use Delaware as a self-designation in English. The term Delaware was originally applied by British colonists to Unami speakers living along the Delaware River, which is named after Lord De La Warr, the first governor of Virginia. The term was gradually extended to refer to all Delaware groups.

The Munsee in Ontario are sometimes referred to as "Ontario Delaware" or "Canadian Delaware". In English, Moraviantown residents call themselves Delaware, and in Munsee  'Delaware person, Indian'.

Some Delaware at Moraviantown also use the term Christian Indian as a preferred self-designation in English. The English term Lenape is of Unami origin, and is used in English as a self-designation by speakers of Unami;

Exceptionally among scholars, Kraft uses Lenape as an English-language cover term to refer to all Delaware-speaking groups, while noting that this usage is "not entirely appropriate".

Geographic distribution
Speakers of Munsee originally resided in the greater Manhattan area, the drainage of the Lower Hudson River valley, and the upper Delaware River. The arrival of European explorers, traders and settlers resulted in the progressive displacement of Munsee people over a period of several centuries. Munsee groups affected by this process ultimately moved away from their homeland to communities in both the United States and Canada.

In the 20th century, surviving Munsee speakers in Canada lived at Six Nations, Ontario; Munceytown, Ontario; and Moraviantown Reserve.  Now extinct in the first two locations, the language is used only by a few elders at Moraviantown, Ontario.

Since the early 21st century, the language has been taught to tribal members of the Stockbridge-Munsee Band of Mohican Native Americans, and the Delaware Nation, Moraviantown Reserve.

Original location
The southern boundary of Munsee territory was the area north of the Delaware Water Gap, following the river system southeast along the Raritan River to the Atlantic Ocean. To the south of the Munsee were the Unami Delaware. To the north were the Algonquian Mahican, and to the east were the Eastern Long Island peoples, who also spoke Algonquian languages, such as Unquachog (also spelled Unkechaug) and southern New England languages, such as Quiripi. (Quiripi and Unquachog are likely members of a dialect continuum of a single language.)

Aboriginally, and for a period subsequent to the arrival of Europeans, Munsee was spoken within a series of small and largely autonomous local bands, located primarily within the drainage of the Hudson and upper Delaware rivers, the major river systems of the area. The general pattern, found throughout the Eastern Algonquian area, was one in which indigenous groups resided along the drainages of major river systems, with divisions between upriver and downriver groupings. Named groups were found on the major tributaries; they developed larger sites on the main streams and smaller camps at the headwaters and on feeder streams. Estimates vary, but these local groups may have had a population of up to two hundred people each. These groups spoke localized varieties of the language now called Munsee, but there is little information on dialect variation within the Munsee-speaking area.

The primary known named Munsee groups, from north to south on the west side of the Hudson River, were the 
Esopus, west of the Hudson River in the Hudson River watershed (with subgroups the Waoranecks, Warranawankongs, and others);
Minisink (above the Delaware Water Gap);
Haverstraw, Tappan, and Hackensack, south of the Hudson Highlands west of the Hudson River;
Raritan, who originally resided on the lower Raritan River and moved inland;
Wiechquaeskeck, from east of the Hudson who migrated to the lower Raritan after 1649; with the 
Navasink, to the east along the north shore of New Jersey east of the Delaware River.

The Wappinger were to the east of the upper Hudson; below them going north to south on the east bank of the Hudson were the 
Kichtawank;
Sinsink;
Rechgawawank;
Nayack;
Marechkawieck, with the Canarsee and Rockaway on western Long Island; and
Massapequa and Matinecock on central Long Island, who may have been Munsee or perhaps were the predecessors of the Unquachog group identified in the eighteenth century.

The disruptions resulting from the entry of European settlers, fur traders, and explorers led to the displacement of these local groups. They gradually consolidated into larger groups that brought together speakers from the different groups within the Munsee-speaking area.

Phonology
Munsee phonology is complex but regular in many regards. Metrical rules of syllable weight assignment play a key role in the assignment of word-level stress, and also determine the form of rules of vowel Syncope that produce complex but mostly regular alternations in the forms of words. Word-level stress is largely predictable, with exceptions occurring primarily in loan words, reduplicated forms, and in words where historical change has made historically transparent alternations more opaque.

Consonants and vowels
Munsee has the following inventory of consonants; International Phonetic Alphabet (IPA) values are given in brackets.

Some loan words from English contain  and :  'there is a fair going on';  'my tire.'

Different analyses of the Munsee vowel system have been proposed. Goddard (1979) presents an analysis in which Munsee and Unami have the same vowel system, unchanged from the Proto-Eastern-Algonquian vowel system (discussed in the History section below). In this analysis, there are four long vowels  and two short vowels . Vowel length is indicated with a raised dot (·). However, in modern Munsee there are several sources of new short  that arise from such sources as reduplication, loan words, and other various phonological changes, and that cannot be derived from other underlying vowels.

The short vowel  has the phonetic value .

Syllable weight
Syllable weight plays a significant role in Munsee phonology, determining stress placement and the deletion of certain short vowels. All syllables containing long vowels are strong. Any short vowel in a closed syllable (i.e. (C)VC) is strong. Counting left to right, in a sequence of two or more open syllables containing short vowels, the odd-numbered syllable is weak and the even-numbered syllable is strong. As well, certain syllables containing short vowels (frequently such syllables occur in reduplicated syllables and loan words) must exceptionally be marked as strong.

In words longer than two syllables, the final syllable is excluded from consideration of stress placement, i.e. is extrametrical, and the last strong syllable preceding the final syllable in the word receives the main stress.

(a)  'rifle' (strong penultimate, receives primary stress)

(b)  'if I see him' (weak penultimate, preceding syllable receives primary stress)

In disyllabic words a strong penultimate syllable receives primary stress.

(a)  's/he gets up from lying down' (disyllabic Strong-Strong)

In a disyllable with a weak penultimate syllable, the final syllable is strong, and receives primary stress.

(a)  'stone' (disyllabic Weak-Strong)

Grammar

The grammar of Munsee is characterized by complex inflectional and derivational morphology. Inflection in Munsee is realized through the use of prefixes and suffixes added to word stems to indicate grammatical information, including number (singular or plural), gender, person, possession, negation, obviation, and others.

Nouns use combinations of person prefixes and suffixes to indicate possession, and suffixes to indicate gender, number, diminutive, absentative, and obviation.

Verbs use a single set of person prefixes and a series of suffixes in position classes following the verb stem to indicate combinations of person, number, negation, obviation, and others.

Writing system
There is no standard writing system for Munsee. Linguists have tended to use common phonetic transcription symbols of the type found in the International Phonetic Alphabet or similar Americanist symbols in order to represent sounds that are not consistently represented in conventional standard writing systems.

Europeans writing down Delaware words and sentences have tended to use adaptations of European alphabets and associated conventions. The quality of such transliterated renditions have varied widely, as Europeans attempted to record sounds and sound combinations they were not familiar with.

A practical orthography for Munsee has been created in the context of various language preservation and documentation projects. A recent bilingual dictionary of Munsee uses a practical orthography derived from a linguistic transcription system for Munsee. The same system is also used in a recent word book produced locally at Moraviantown. The related Unami language is written using a distinct practical orthography.

Writing system samples
The table below presents a sample of Munsee words, written first in a linguistically oriented transcription, followed by the same words written in a practical system. The linguistic system uses a raised dot (·) to indicate vowel length. Although stress is mostly predictable, the linguistic system uses the acute accent to indicate predictable main stress. As well, predictable voiceless or murmured  is indicated with the breve accent (˘). Similarly, the breve accent is used to indicate an ultra-short  that typically occurs before a single voiced consonant followed by a vowel.

The practical system indicates vowel length by doubling the vowel letter, and maintains the linɡuistic system's practices for marking stress and voiceless/ultra-short vowels.

Linguistic variation 
Currently, the Munsee language has eight native speakers whose personal dialects vary from each other.  Extensive details about how the language differs between all eight speakers have been cataloged in a paper by Ives Goddard titled "The Personal Dialects of Moraviantown Delaware" which was published in Anthropological Linguistics volume 52.

Phonological variation

Optional pronunciation of final  
Nouns and verbs that end in -i•w, -e•w and -a•w; some speakers often dropped the -w.  This drop also carried over into "careful speech".

A large class of particles and pre-words that are usually heard with final  retained the original  in the speech of some speakers.

Words that end with the negative suffix  or the subjunctive suffix  had variants with final .

Particles originally in  

Other lexicalized variations

Variation between | a | and | ə | 
Some words have variation between underlying | a | and | ə |.  It is possible to determine which vowel is older and which might be the innovation by using evidence from other Algonquin languages, other Munsee communities and earlier sources.

Variation between short and long vowels 
An initial and three words show variation between short and long vowels.  These words are:

 ~  - 'scoop':  ~  'he dips up water'

 ~  'spider'

 ~  'whippoorwill'

 ~  'apron'

Variation between | nš | and | nč |. 
Two words have | nš | varying with | nč |.T

These words are  ~  'corncob' and  ~  'elderberries'.

Other differences in a single segment 
A number of cases are present where one segment varies or is variably present.

'juneberry'.

Nouns with variably present . 
Some nouns are found with and without a final .

Bird names with | l | ~ | n |. 
In two bird names, | l | varies with | n |.

For example:  ~  'kingfisher';  ~   'bluebird'. More complex variation 
Some words have more complex patterns of variation. For example: the word 'table' –  is the original.

 Different words 
Some cases involve different words or "highly divergent variants" used as synonyms. For example, there are four ways to say 'eyelashes' that are seen in the personal dialects.

 Variation origination 
There is no community norm, as the more widely used variants do not define a community norm for either the speakers or the linguist.  Additionally, some variants cannot be rated as more and less popular or acceptable.  "Even a normative description would have to give both or all of them".

Some variation originates externally.  Some usages can be traced directly to the Northern Unami language that was earlier spoken by some members of the Munsee community.

Some variation originates internally.  These pronunciations and grammatical tendencies are likely to have emerged in the not too distant past.

History
Munsee is an Eastern Algonquian language. The hypothetical common ancestor language from which the Eastern Algonquian languages descend is Proto-Eastern Algonquian (PEA). An intermediate group, Delawaran, a descendant of Proto-Eastern Algonquian, consists of Mahican and Common Delaware, the latter being a further subgroup comprising Munsee Delaware and Unami Delaware. The justification for Delawaran as an intermediate subgroup rests upon the high degree of similarity between Mahican and the two Delaware languages, but relatively little detailed argumentation in support of Delaware has been adduced.Goddard, Ives, 1978

Munsee is demonstrably phonologically conservative, and is considered to have retained many of the phonological characteristics of PEA. In comparison, Unami has undergone extensive phonological innovation, coupled with morphological regularization.

The PEA vowel system consisted of four long vowels *i·, *o·, *e·, *a·,  and two short vowels *a and ə. The vowel history is as follows: *i· (from PEA merger of Proto-Algonquian (PA *i· and *i to PEA *i·), *o· (from PEA merger of PA *o· and *o ), *e· (from Proto-Algonquian *e·), and *a· (from Proto-Algonquian *a·; the short vowels are*ə (from Proto-Algonquian *e), and *a (from Proto-Algonquian *a). This system was continued down to Common Delaware, but Munsee and Unami have innovated separately with respect to the vowel systems.

Contrastive vowel length for Munsee high vowels has been reintroduced, and also for the front mid-vowels. For modern Munsee it is necessary to recognize long  and short . Innovating instances of short  arise from for example reduplicating syllables and loan words.

See also
Delaware People
Monsey, New York

Notes

References

 Cohen, Patricia. 2010. Indian Tribes Go in Search of Their Lost Languages, New York Times, April 6, 2010, C1
 Costa, David. J. 2007. "The dialectology of Southern New England Algonquian. H.C. Wolfart, ed. Papers of the 38th Algonquian Conference, pp. 81-127. Winnipeg: University of Manitoba. 
 Dahlstrom, Amy. 1995. "Motivation vs. Predictability in Algonquian gender.” H. C. Wolfart, ed., Papers of the Thirty-Third Algonquian Conference, 52-66. Winnipeg: University of Manitoba. 
 Goddard, Ives. 1971. "The ethnohistorical implications of early Delaware linguistic materials." Man in the Northeast 1: 14-26.
 Goddard, Ives. 1974. "The Delaware Language, Past and Present." Herbert C. Kraft, ed. A Delaware Indian Symposium, pp. 103–110. Anthropological Series No. 4. Harrisburg: Pennsylvania Historical and Museum Commission.
 Goddard, Ives. 1978. "Eastern Algonquian Languages." Bruce Trigger, ed., Handbook of North American Indians, Volume 15, Northeast, pp. 70–77. Washington: Smithsonian Institution. 
 Goddard, Ives. 1978a. "Delaware." Bruce Trigger, ed., Handbook of North American Indians, Volume 15. Northeast, pp. 213–239. Washington: The Smithsonian Institution. 
 Goddard, Ives. 1979. Delaware Verbal Morphology. New York: Garland. 
 Goddard, Ives. 1982. "Munsee historical phonology." International Journal of American Linguistics 48: 16-48.
 Goddard, Ives. 1990. "Aspects of the Topic Structure of Fox Narratives: Proximate Shifts and the Use of Overt and Inflectional NPs." International Journal of American Linguistics 56: 317-340
 Goddard, Ives. 1996. "Introduction." Ives Goddard, ed., The Handbook of North American Indians, Volume 17. Languages, pp. 1–16. Washington, D.C.: The Smithsonian Institution. 
 Goddard, Ives. 2002. "Grammatical gender in Algonquian." H.C. Wolfart, ed., Papers of the Thirty-Third Algonquian Conference, pp. 195–231. Winnipeg: University of Manitoba. 
 Kraft, Herbert. 1986. The Lenape: Archaeology, History, and Ethnography. Newark: New Jersey Historical Society. 
 Kraft, Herbert. 1986a. "Settlement Patterns in the Upper Delaware Valley." Jay F. Custer, ed., Late Woodland Cultures of the Middle Atlantic Region, pp. 102–115. Newark: University of Delaware Press. 
 McDowell, Adam. 2009. " More than words: Can Canada's dying languages be saved?" National Post. January 22, 2009. Retrieved May 29, 2009
 Nichols, John D. and Earl Nyholm. 1995. A concise dictionary of Minnesota Ojibwe. Minneapolis: University of Minnesota Press. 
 O'Meara, John. 1992. "Intransitive Verbs with Secondary Objects in Munsee Delaware." W. Cowan, ed., Proceedings of the Twenty-Third Algonquian Conference, pp. 322–333. Ottawa: Carleton University.  
 O'Meara, John. 1996. Delaware/English - English/Delaware Dictionary. Toronto: University of Toronto Press. 
 Rudes, Blair. 1997. 1997. "Resurrecting Wampano (Quiripi) from the dead: Phonological preliminaries." Anthropological Linguistics 39: 1-59
 Snow, Dean. 1978. "Late prehistory of the East coast." Bruce Trigger, ed., Handbook of North American Indians, Volume 15. Northeast, pp. 58-. Washington: The Smithsonian Institution. 
 Williams, Lorraine E. 1995. "Indians and Europeans in the Delaware River Valley, 1620-1655." Carol E. Hoffecker, Richard Waldron, Lorraine E. Williams, and Barbara E. Benson, eds., New Sweden in America, pp. 112–120. Newark: University of Delaware Press. 

Further reading
 Blalock, Lucy, Bruce Pearson and James Rementer. 1994. The Delaware Language. Bartlesville, OK: Delaware Tribe of Indians.
 Brinton, Daniel G., and Albert Seqaqkind Anthony. 1888. A Lenâpé-English dictionary. From an anonymous manuscript in the archives of the Moravian Church at Bethlehem Philadelphia: The Historical Society of Pennsylvania.
 Delaware Nation Council. 1992. Lunaapeew Dictionary. Basic Words. Part One. Moraviantown: Delaware Nation Council.
 Goddard, Ives. 1974a. "Dutch Loanwords in Delaware." Herbert C. Kraft, ed. A Delaware Indian Symposium, pp. 153–160. Anthropological Series No. 4. Harrisburg: Pennsylvania Historical and Museum Commission.
 Goddard, Ives. 1977. "Some early examples of American Indian Pidgin English from New England." International Journal of American Linguistics 43: 37-41.
 Goddard, Ives. 1979a. "Comparative Algonquian." Lyle Campbell and Marianne Mithun, eds, The languages of Native America, pp. 70–132. Austin: University of Texas Press. 
 Goddard, Ives. 1994. "The West-to-East Cline in Algonquian Dialectology." William Cowan, ed., Papers of the 25th Algonquian Conference, pp. 187–211. Ottawa: Carleton University. 
 Michelson, Truman. 1922. [Field notes collected at Moraviantown and Six Nations]. Ms. 1635. National Anthropological Archives, Smithsonian Institution.
 Pearson, Bruce. 1988. A Grammar of Delaware: Semantics, Morpho-Syntax, Lexicon, Phonology. Dewey, OK: Touching Leaves Indian Crafts.
 Zeisberger, David. 1887. Ebenezer N. Horsford, ed., Zeisberger's Indian Dictionary, English, German, Iroquois — the Onondaga, and Algonquin — the Delaware.'' Cambridge, Massachusetts: John Wilson.

External links
  Lunaapeew Language, Delaware Nation Language, Cultural and Historical Department
 Munsee, Ramapough Lenaape Nation
 Language & Culture Committee, Stockbridge Munsee Community Band of Mohican Indians
 
 Native Languages of the Americas: Munsee Delaware (Minsi, Muncey, Minisink)
 Collection of Hymns, in Muncey and English, for the Use of the Native Indians, 1874
 OLAC resources in and about the Munsee language
 http://munseedelaware.com Site devoted to the study of the Munsee Delaware language

Eastern Algonquian languages
Indigenous languages of the North American eastern woodlands
First Nations languages in Canada
Indigenous languages of Pennsylvania
Native American history of New York (state)
Native American history of Pennsylvania
Endangered Algic languages